Portrait of a Seated Woman is an oil on canvas painting by Dutch painter Nicolaes Maes. Its date of execution is unknown. Maes first recorded painting dates back to 1653. Maes, a pupil of Rembrandt, started his career as a painter of biblical and mythological subjects, genre paintings and as a portraitist. He died in 1693. The paintings measures 112,5 x 91,5 cm, and is currently housed at the Royal Museum of Fine Arts in Antwerp.

References

1650s paintings
Paintings in the collection of the Royal Museum of Fine Arts Antwerp
Paintings by Nicolaes Maes
Portraits of women